The Zimbabwe national under-23 football team (Nicknamed The Warriors), represents Zimbabwe in men's under-23 international football and is controlled by the Zimbabwe Football Association (ZIFA), formerly known as the Football Association of Rhodesia.

Players
The following squad was selected ahead of 2019 CAF Africa U-23 Cup of National qualifiers.

Recent results & fixtures
The following is a list of match results from the previous 12 months, as well as any future matches that have been scheduled.

2019

Competitive records

Olympic Games

Africa Cup of Nations

All Africa Games

*Draws include knockout matches decided by penalty shootout.

References

External links
Zimbabwe Football Association official website

African national association football teams
Football in Zimbabwe